The Antelope County News is a weekly newspaper and website located in Neligh, Nebraska, owned by Pitzer Digital, LLC. It was named the top weekly newspaper in Nebraska in 2018, winning the Loral Johnson Community Sweepstakes Award from the Nebraska Press Association. The publication also won 35 awards at the 2018 Better Newspaper Contest.

The Antelope County News was launched in digital-only form on January 1, 2014, by publisher and owner Carrie Pitzer. On February 11, 2016, Pitzer Digital purchased The Orchard News from John and Lucy Ferguson, and transformed it into the first county-wide print publication in Antelope County as the Antelope County News/Orchard News. It immediately became the first color newspaper in Antelope County.

The Orchard News began publishing in 1901 in the community of Orchard.

Other Media 
The Antelope County News collaborates with other media and has been used as a credible source for multiple publications, including the Lincoln Journal-Star, Kansas City Star, Omaha World-Herald, North Platte Telegraph, The State, AOL, Valley News, Daytona Daily News, Atlanta Journal-Constitution, New York Daily News.

Pitzer Digital LLC also owns the Bloomfield Monitor/Knox County News newspaper and Living Here magazine.

Awards 
2018 Nebraska Press Association

Loral Johnson Community Sweepstakes Award For Top Weekly Newspaper

Division A Sweepstakes Winner

First Place Awards

Building Circulation: Carrie Pitzer on Connecting With Alumni

Reader Interaction/Contest: Staff on Facebook Fun

Small Ad: Samantha Cleveland on Stealth Broadband

Signature Page: Samantha Cleveland on State Volleyball

Creative Ad Writing: Samantha Cleveland on Sign of the Times

Breaking News Photography: Carrie Pitzer on Squealing (Semi Rolls)

Use of Color Carrie Pitzer & Samantha Cleveland on Ribbon of Hope (Sydney Loofe)

Special Section (Single Publication Days): Staff on Progress Edition

Special Section (Multiple Publication Days): Staff on Senior Sections

Single Feature Story: Carrie Pitzer on Look for Me in Rainbows (Rebecca Ickes Hausmann)

In-depth Writing: Cadrien Livingston on Gone With the Wind

Public Notice and Its Promotion: Carrie Pitzer

Online Video: Carrie Pitzer on Volunteers Round Up 1,500 Pigs

Online Coverage of Breaking News: Staff on Sydney Loofe

Best Use of Social Media: Staff on Sydney Loofe

50 - Best Digital Ad Idea:  Carrie Pitzer on Need for Speed

Second Place Awards

Best New Idea – News: Staff on Facebook Live for News

Use of Color: Carrie Pitzer on Quinceanera

Youth Coverage: Staff

Online Video: Carrie Pitzer & Dylan Widger on AMH 65th Anniversary

Online Coverage of Breaking News: Carrie Pitzer on Semi Overturns

Best Digital Ad Idea:  Carrie Pitzer on Click for a Tow

Online Video: Carrie Pitzer on Uprooted Traveling Boutique

Online Coverage of Breaking News: Carrie Pitzer on Fatal Accident

Third Place Awards

Single Classified Advertising Idea: Samantha Cleveland on Bus Driver Help Wanted

Sports Feature Photo: Carrie Pitzer on Diaper Division

Headline Writing: Carrie Pitzer

Front Page: Carrie Pitzer

2017 Nebraska Press Association

Division A Sweepstakes Third Place

First Place Awards

Online Coverage Of Breaking News: Staff on Tilden Manhunt.

Best New Idea - News: Wade Pitzer and Logan Lawson on Player Profiles.

Building Circulation: Carrie Pitzer on Orchard Alumni Association.

Headline Writing: Carrie Pitzer.

Reader Interaction/Contest: Staff on #BeKindNoExceptions and #PayItForward.

Feature Series: Natalie Bruzon on Orchard’s “Small Town Success.”

Online Video: Jaimie Schmitz on Elgin’s Wiggle Chairs.

Second Place Awards

Best New Idea - Ads/Marketing: Carrie Pitzer on online advertising codes with Neligh Chamber of Commerce

Online Video: Staff on ACT video

Use Of Computer Graphics-Produced In House: Samantha Cleveland on enrollment trends with feasibility study of Clearwater, Orchard and Ewing.

Signature Page: Carrie Pitzer on Neligh-Oakdale’s perfect football season.

Use of Color: Carrie Pitzer on Thiele Dairy.

Third Place Awards

Sports Writing: Logan Lawson on Matt & Angie Belitz family, “Home Plate Is Where The Heart Is.”

Single Feature Story: Carrie Pitzer on Candice Moser and Becky Moser kidney transplant, “Gift Of Life.”

Online Coverage Of Breaking News: Carrie Pitzer & Jaimie Schmitz on grain bin rescue north of Neligh.

Front Page Design: Carrie Pitzer.

References

Weekly newspapers published in the United States
Newspapers published in Nebraska